Savile is a surname. Notable people with the surname include:

 Arthur Savile (1819–1870), English clergyman and cricketer
 David Savile, actor, married to Lois Baxter
 Douglas Barton Osborne Savile (1909–2000), mycologist 
 Dorothy Savile, Viscountess Halifax (1640–1670)
 Dorothy Savile, Countess of Burlington and of Cork (1699–1758), painter and wife of Richard Boyle, 3rd Earl of Burlington
 George Savile, 1st Marquess of Halifax (1633–1695)
 George Savile (disambiguation), for others of that name
 Henry Savile (died 1558), MP for Yorkshire
 Henry Savile (died 1569), MP for Yorkshire and Grantham
 Henry Savile (Bible translator) (1549–1622)
 Henry Savile (politician) (1642–1687)
 Jimmy Savile (1926–2011), DJ, presenter and media personality 
 John Savile, 1st Baron Savile of Pontefract (1556–1630), politician; M.P., Lincolnshire and Yorkshire
 John Savile, 1st Baron Savile (second creation) (1818–1896), British diplomat; Ambassador to Italy, 1883–1888
 Leopold Halliday Savile (1870–1953), British civil engineer
 Steven Savile (born 1969), a British fantasy, horror and thriller writer, and editor living in Stockholm, Sweden
 William Savile, 2nd Marquess of Halifax (1665–1700)

See also
 Baron Savile
 Savile Club
 Savile Row
 Savile Town
 Savill (surname)
 Saville (disambiguation)
 Savills
 Seville